Francesco Guarino or Guarini (1611 – 1651 or 1654) was an Italian painter of the Baroque period, active mainly in the mountainous area east of Naples called Irpinia, and in other areas of the Kingdom of Naples, chiefly Campania, Apulia, and Molise.

Biography 
He was born in Sant'Andrea Apostolo, today a frazione of Solofra in the Province of Avellino, Campania, and died in Gravina di Puglia. He was a pupil first locally of his father, Giovanni Tommaso Guarino, before moving to Naples to work in the studio of Massimo Stanzione. In Naples, like many of his contemporaries there, he was influenced by the style of Caravaggio. In his selection of models who appear to have been plucked from the streets of Naples, he recalls the style of Bernardo Cavallino, the fellow-pupil of Stanzioni. Among his masterpieces are the works for  Collegiata di San Michele Arcangelo in Solofra.

References
Short biography
Short biography
Biography and images from History of Solofra webpage

External links
Orazio and Artemisia Gentileschi, a fully digitized exhibition catalog from The Metropolitan Museum of Art Libraries, which contains material on Francesco Guarino (see index)

1611 births
1650s deaths
People from the Province of Avellino
17th-century Italian painters
Italian male painters
Italian Baroque painters
Painters from Naples
Caravaggisti